Panagiota Lytra (born 14 December 2006) is a Greek rhythmic gymnast.

Career 
Lytra made her breakthrough in 2022 when she became senior. At Miss Valentine in Tartu she won gold with clubs, silver with ball and bronze with ribbon, catching the eyes of fans worldwide.

At her first ever World Cup in Athens Panagiota managed to win bronze with clubs, the first medal for an individual from Greece in the circuit. She then went on to compete at more World Cups in Sofia and Pesaro where she confirmed her good shape by getting in event finals and barely missing out on the podium.

She was therefore selected to compete to the 2022 European Championships in Tel Aviv, Israel. She qualified in 10th place for the All-Around final, ending 16th with 121.150 points. Lytra also made it to the clubs final finishing in 7th scoring 31.25, the best ever ranking for an individual Greek rhythmic gymnast in this apparatus at the European Championships.

Routine music information

References

External links 
 

2006 births
Living people
Gymnasts from Athens
Greek rhythmic gymnasts